Volga State University of Technology (formerly Mari State Technical University) (Povolzhskiy gosudárstvennyy tehnologicheskiy universitét), previously known as MarSTU (MarGTU), is the first technical, and one of the first institutions of higher education in the republic of Mari El.

Names 
 1932–68 – Povolzhskiy Forestry Engineering Institute
 1968–82 – Mari Polytechnic Institute named after M. Gorky
 1982–95 – Mari Awarded with the Order of People's Friendship Polytechnic Institute named after M. Gorky
 1995–2012 – Mari State Technical University
 2012–present – Volga State University of Technology

Departments 
 Woodworking Technology Department
 Standardization and Certification
 Forest Engineering
 Woodworking Technology
 Machine-Building Department
 Agricultural Mechanization
 Industrial Heat-and-Power Engineering
 Forest Industry Machinery
 Materials Science and Technology of Emerging Materials
 Machine-Building Technology
 Maintenance of Transportation and Production Equipment (in Wood-Chemical Industry)
 Transportation Security and Management
 Radio Engineering Department
 Medical-Biological Engineering
 Design and Technology of Computing Systems
 Radio Engineering
 Radio Communication and Broadcasting
 Electronics and Nanoelectronics 
 Management and Information Science in Engineering Systems
 Quality Management
 Civil Engineering Department
 Civil Engineering
 Building Design
 Real Estate Expertise and Management
 Highways and Aerodromes
 Information Science and Computer Engineering Department
 Information Security
 Computer Engineering
 Programming
 Forestry and Ecology Department
 Nature Management
 Forestry
 Landscape Architecture
 Nature Protection, Management and Water Conservation Department
 Environmental Safety in Technosphere
 Water Multiple Use and Conservation
 Social Studies Department Department
 Tourism and Service
 Social Policy
 Administration and Management Department
 Marketing
 Business Administration in Agricultural and Industrial Sectors
 Public Administration
 Company Management
 Economics Department
 Finances
 Taxation
 Accountancy Studies and Audit
 Mathematical Methods in Economics
 Economics and Management (in Wood-Chemical Sector)
 Application Informatics (in Economics)

Notes

External links 
 English language and Russian language official website  and 

Education in Mari El
Education in the Soviet Union
Yoshkar-Ola
Universities in Russia
Buildings and structures in Mari El
Technical universities and colleges in Russia